Westover Down is a chalk down on the Isle of Wight. It is located close to the village of Brook, in the southwest of the island, and rises to 205 metres at its highest point, northeast of the village.

Hills of the Isle of Wight